Ferdinand-Joseph Robidoux (October 17, 1875 –  June 17, 1962) was a lawyer and political figure of Acadian descent in New Brunswick, Canada. He represented Kent in the House of Commons of Canada from 1911 to 1917 as a Conservative.

He was born in Shediac, New Brunswick, the son of Ferdinand Robidoux, who was editor-owner of Le Moniteur acadien, and Marguerite Michaud. Robidoux was educated at Saint Joseph's University. In 1913, he married Emily Annette Evans. Robidoux practised law in Richibucto. He served on the New Brunswick Electric Power Commission from 1925 to 1935 and the New Brunswick Liquor Control Board from 1927 to 1935. He served as secretary for Kent Municipality and as a member of the town council for Shediac. Robidoux ran unsuccessfully for a seat in the House of Commons in 1908. He was defeated when he ran for re-election in the 1917 federal election held as a result of the Conscription Crisis of 1917. Robidoux ran as a supporter of the pro-conscription Unionist government and was defeated by an anti-conscription Laurier Liberal.

He founded L'Imprimerie Nationale and was publisher for La Nation from 1929 to 1930. He was the author of Les Conventions nationales des Acadiens, published in 1907.

References

Members of the House of Commons of Canada from New Brunswick
Conservative Party of Canada (1867–1942) MPs
Acadian people
1875 births
1962 deaths
Persons of National Historic Significance (Canada)
People from Shediac